Alfredo "Fredy" López-Salegio (born 24 May 1992) is a judoka from El Salvador.

References 

 

Salvadoran male judoka
Living people
1992 births
Place of birth missing (living people)
21st-century Salvadoran people